Frederick Winslow Taylor (March 20, 1856 – March 21, 1915) was an American mechanical engineer. He was widely known for his methods to improve industrial efficiency. He was one of the first management consultants. In 1909, Taylor summed up his efficiency techniques in his book The Principles of Scientific Management which, in 2001, Fellows of the Academy of Management voted the most influential management book of the twentieth century. His pioneering work in applying engineering principles to the work done on the factory floor was instrumental in the creation and development of the branch of engineering that is now known as industrial engineering. Taylor made his name, and was most proud of his work, in scientific management; however, he made his fortune patenting steel-process improvements. As a result, scientific management is sometimes referred to as Taylorism.

Biography
Taylor was born in 1856 to a Quaker family in Germantown, Philadelphia, Pennsylvania. Taylor's father, Franklin Taylor, a Princeton-educated lawyer, built his wealth on mortgages. Taylor's mother, Emily Annette Taylor (née Winslow), was an ardent abolitionist and a coworker with Lucretia Mott. His father's ancestor, Samuel Taylor, settled in Burlington, New Jersey, in 1677. His mother's ancestor, Edward Winslow, was one of the fifteen original Mayflower Pilgrims who brought servants or children, and one of eight who had the honorable distinction of Mister. Winslow served for many years as the Governor of the Plymouth colony.

Educated early by his mother, Taylor studied for two years in France and Germany and traveled Europe for 18 months. In 1872, he entered Phillips Exeter Academy in Exeter, New Hampshire, with the plan of eventually going to Harvard and becoming a lawyer like his father. In 1874, Taylor passed the Harvard entrance examinations with honors. However, due allegedly to rapidly deteriorating eyesight, Taylor chose quite a different path.

Instead of attending Harvard University, Taylor became an apprentice patternmaker and machinist, gaining shop-floor experience at Enterprise Hydraulic Works in Philadelphia (a pump-manufacturing company whose proprietors were friends of the Taylor family). He left his apprenticeship for six months and represented a group of New England machine-tool manufacturers at Philadelphia's centennial exposition. Taylor finished his four-year apprenticeship and in 1878 became a machine-shop laborer at Midvale Steel Works. At Midvale, he was quickly promoted to time clerk, journeyman machinist, gang boss over the lathe hands, machine shop foreman, research director, and finally chief engineer of the works (while maintaining his position as machine shop foreman). Taylor's fast promotions reflected both his talent and his family's relationship with Edward Clark, part owner of Midvale Steel. (Edward Clark's son Clarence Clark, who was also a manager at Midvale Steel, married Taylor's sister.)

Early on at Midvale, working as a laborer and machinist, Taylor recognized that workmen were working their machines, or themselves, not nearly as hard as they could (a practice that at the time was called "soldiering") and that this resulted in high labor costs for the company. When he became a foreman he expected more output from the workmen. In order to determine how much work should properly be expected, he began to study and analyze the productivity of both the men and the machines (although the word "productivity" was not used at the time, and the applied science of productivity had not yet been developed). His focus on the human component of production Taylor labeled scientific management.

While Taylor worked at Midvale, he and Clarence Clark won the first tennis doubles tournament in the 1881 US National Championships, the precursor of the US Open. Taylor became a student of Stevens Institute of Technology, studying via correspondence and obtaining a bachelor's degree in mechanical engineering in 1883. On May 3, 1884, he married Louise M. Spooner of Philadelphia.

From 1890 until 1893 Taylor worked as a general manager and a consulting engineer to management for the Manufacturing Investment Company of Philadelphia, a company that operated large paper mills in Maine and Wisconsin. He was a plant manager in Maine. In 1893, Taylor opened an independent consulting practice in Philadelphia. His business card read "Consulting Engineer - Systematizing Shop Management and Manufacturing Costs a Specialty". Through these consulting experiences, Taylor perfected his management system. His first paper, A Piece Rate System, was presented to the American Society of Mechanical Engineers (ASME) in June 1895.

In 1898 he joined Bethlehem Steel to solve an expensive machine-shop capacity problem. While at Bethlehem, he discovered the best known and most profitable of his many patents: between 1898 and 1900 Taylor and Maunsel White (né Maunsel White III; 1856–1912; grandson of Maunsel White; 1783–1863) conducted comprehensive empirical tests, and concluded that tungsten alloyed steel doubled or quadrupled cutting speeds. The inventors received  for the English patents alone, although the U.S. patent was eventually nullified.

Taylor was forced to leave Bethlehem Steel in 1901 after discord with other managers. Now a wealthy man, Taylor focused the remainder of his career promoting his management and machining methods through lecturing, writing, and consulting. In 1910, owing to the Eastern Rate Case, Frederick Winslow Taylor and his Scientific Management methodologies became famous worldwide. In 1911, Taylor introduced his The Principles of Scientific Management paper to the ASME, eight years after his Shop Management paper.

On October 19, 1906, Taylor was awarded an honorary degree of Doctor of Science by the University of Pennsylvania. Taylor eventually became a professor at the Tuck School of Business at Dartmouth College. In early spring of 1915 Taylor caught pneumonia and died, one day after his fifty-ninth birthday, on March 21, 1915. He was buried in West Laurel Hill Cemetery, in Bala Cynwyd, Pennsylvania.

Work

Taylor was a mechanical engineer who sought to improve industrial efficiency. He is regarded as the father of scientific management, and was one of the first management consultants and director of a famous firm. In Peter Drucker's description,

Taylor's scientific management consisted of four principles:
Replace rule-of-thumb work methods with methods based on a scientific study of the tasks.
Scientifically select, train, and develop each employee rather than passively leaving them to train themselves.
Provide "Detailed instruction and supervision of each worker in the performance of that worker's discrete task"
Divide work nearly equally between managers and workers, so that the managers apply scientific management principles to planning the work and the workers actually perform the tasks.

Future US Supreme Court justice Louis Brandeis coined the term scientific management in the course of his argument for the Eastern Rate Case before the Interstate Commerce Commission in 1910. Brandeis argued that railroads, when governed according to Taylor's principles, did not need to raise rates to increase wages. Taylor used Brandeis's term in the title of his monograph The Principles of Scientific Management, published in 1911. The Eastern Rate Case propelled Taylor's ideas to the forefront of the management agenda. Taylor wrote to Brandeis, "I have rarely seen a new movement started with such great momentum as you have given this one." Taylor's approach is also often referred to as Taylor's Principles, or, frequently disparagingly, as Taylorism.

Managers and workers

Taylor had very precise ideas about how to introduce his system:

Workers were to be selected appropriately for each task.

Taylor believed in transferring control from workers to management. He set out to increase the distinction between mental (planning work) and manual labor (executing work). Detailed plans, specifying the job and how it was to be done, were to be formulated by management and communicated to the workers.

The introduction of his system was often resented by workers and provoked numerous strikes. The strike at Watertown Arsenal led to the congressional investigation in 1912.
Taylor believed the laborer was worthy of his hire, and pay was linked to productivity. His workers were able to earn substantially more than those under conventional management, and this earned him enemies among the owners of factories where scientific management was not in use.

Rhetorical techniques
Taylor promised to reconcile labor and capital.

Scholarly debate about increased efficiency moving pig iron at Bethlehem's Iron and Steel
Debate about Taylor's Bethlehem study of workers, particularly the stereotypical laborer "Schmidt", continues to this day. One 2009 study supports assertions Taylor made about the quite substantial increase in productivity, for even the most basic task of picking up, carrying and dropping pigs of iron.

Management theory
Taylor thought that by analysing work, the "one best way" to do it would be found. He is most remembered for developing the stopwatch time study, which, combined with Frank Gilbreth's motion study methods, later became the field of time and motion study. He broke a job into its component parts and measured each to the hundredth of a minute. One of his most famous studies involved shovels. He noticed that workers used the same shovel for all materials. He determined that the most effective load was 21½ pounds, and found or designed shovels that for each material would scoop up that amount. He was generally unsuccessful in getting his concepts applied, and was dismissed from Bethlehem Iron Company/Bethlehem Steel Company. Nevertheless, Taylor was able to convince workers who used shovels and whose compensation was tied to how much they produced to adopt his advice about the optimum way to shovel by breaking the movements down into their component elements and recommending better ways to perform these movements. It was largely through his disciples' efforts (most notably Henry Gantt's) that industry came to implement his ideas. Moreover, the book he wrote after parting company with the Bethlehem company, Shop Management, sold well.

Relations with ASME
Taylor's written works were designed for presentation to the American Society of Mechanical Engineers (ASME). These include Notes on Belting (1894), A Piece-Rate System (1895), Shop Management (1903), Art of Cutting Metals (1906), and The Principles of Scientific Management (1911).

Taylor was president of the ASME from 1906 to 1907. While president, he tried to implement his system into the management of the ASME but met with much resistance. He was able to reorganize only the publications department and that only partially. He also forced out the ASME's longtime secretary, Morris Llewellyn Cooke, and replaced him with Calvin W. Rice. His tenure as president was trouble-ridden and marked the beginning of a period of internal dissension within the ASME during the Progressive Age.

In 1911, Taylor collected a number of his articles into a book-length manuscript, which he submitted to the ASME for publication. The ASME formed an ad hoc committee to review the text. The committee included Taylor allies such as James Mapes Dodge and Henry R. Towne. The committee delegated the report to the editor of the American Machinist, Leon P. Alford. Alford was a critic of the Taylor system and his report was negative. The committee modified the report slightly, but accepted Alford's recommendation not to publish Taylor's book. Taylor angrily withdrew the book and published Principles without ASME approval. Taylor published the trade book himself in 1912.

Taylor's influence

United States

Carl G. Barth helped Taylor to develop speed-and-feed-calculating slide rules to a previously unknown level of usefulness. Similar aids are still used in machine shops today. Barth became an early consultant on scientific management and later taught at Harvard.
H. L. Gantt developed the Gantt chart, a visual aid for scheduling tasks and displaying the flow of work.
Harrington Emerson introduced scientific management to the railroad industry, and proposed the dichotomy of staff versus line employees, with the former advising the latter.
Morris Cooke adapted scientific management to educational and municipal organizations.
Hugo Münsterberg created industrial psychology.
Lillian Gilbreth introduced psychology to management studies.
Frank Gilbreth (husband of Lillian) discovered scientific management while working in the construction industry, eventually developing motion studies independently of Taylor. These logically complemented Taylor's time studies, as time and motion are two sides of the efficiency improvement coin. The two fields eventually became time and motion study.
Harvard University, one of the first American universities to offer a graduate degree in business management in 1908, based its first-year curriculum on Taylor's scientific management.
Harlow S. Person, as dean of Dartmouth's Amos Tuck School of Administration and Finance, promoted the teaching of scientific management.
James O. McKinsey, professor of accounting at the University of Chicago and founder of the consulting firm bearing his name, advocated budgets as a means of assuring accountability and of measuring performance.

France
In France, Le Chatelier translated Taylor's work and introduced scientific management throughout government owned plants during World War I. This influenced the French theorist Henri Fayol, whose 1916 Administration Industrielle et Générale emphasized organizational structure in management. In the classic General and Industrial Management, Fayol wrote that "Taylor's approach differs from the one we have outlined in that he examines the firm from the 'bottom up.' He starts with the most elemental units of activity – the workers' actions – then studies the effects of their actions on productivity, devises new methods for making them more efficient, and applies what he learns at lower levels to the hierarchy " He suggests that Taylor has staff analysts and advisors working with individuals at lower levels of the organization to identify the ways to improve efficiency. According to Fayol, the approach results in a "negation of the principle of unity of command." Fayol criticized Taylor's functional management in this way: In Shop Management,  Taylor said « ... the most marked outward characteristics of functional management lies in the fact that each workman, instead of coming in direct contact with the management at one point only, ... receives his daily orders and help from eight different bosses... these eight were (1) route clerks, (2) instruction card men, (3) cost and time clerks, (4) gang bosses, (5) speed bosses, (6) inspectors, (7) repair bosses, and the (8) shop disciplinarian. » Fayol said that this was an unworkable situation and that Taylor must have reconciled the differences in some way not described in Taylor's works.

Around 1922 the journalist Paulette Bernège became interested in Taylor's theories, which were popular in France in the post-war period.
Bernège became the faithful disciple of the Domestic Sciences Movement that Christine Frederick had launched earlier in the United States, which Bernège adapted to French homes.
Frederick had transferred the concepts of Taylorism from the factory to domestic work. These included suitable tools, rational study of movements and timing of tasks. Scientific standards for housework were derived from scientific standards for workshops, intended to streamline the work of a housewife.
The Comité national de l'organisation française (CNOF) was founded in 1925 by a group of journalists and consulting engineers who saw Taylorism as a way to expand their client base.
Founders included prominent engineers such as Henry Louis Le Châtelier and Léon Guillet. Bernège's Institute of Housekeeping Organization participated in various congresses on the scientific organization of work that led up to the founding of the CNOF, and in 1929 led to a section in CNOF on domestic economy.

Great Britain
Older historical accounts used to suggest that British industry had less interest in Taylor's teachings than in similarly sized countries. More recent research has revealed that British engineers and managers were as interested as in other countries. This disparity was largely due to what historians have been analysing: recent research has revealed that Taylor's practices diffused to Britain more through consultancies, in particular the Bedaux consultancy, than through institutions, as in Germany and to a lesser extent France, where a mixture was most effective.

Particularly enthusiastic were the Cadbury family, Seebohm Rowntree, Oliver Sheldon and Lyndall Urwick. In addition to establishing a consultancy to implement Taylor's system, Urwick, Orr & Partners, Urwick was also a key historian of F.W. Taylor and scientific management, publishing The Making of Scientific Management trilogy in the 1940s and The Golden Book of Management in 1956.

Switzerland
In Switzerland, the American Edward Albert Filene established the International Management Institute to spread information about management techniques. Lyndall Urwick was its director until the IMI closed in 1933.Charles D. Wrege, Ronald G. Greenwood, and Sakae Hata, 'The International Management Institute and Political Opposition to its Efforts in Europe, 1925-1934' Business and Economic History (1987) PDF link</ref>

USSR
In the Soviet Union, Vladimir Lenin was very impressed by Taylorism, which he and other Bolshevik leaders tried to incorporate into Soviet manufacturing. When Joseph Stalin took power in the 1920s, he championed the theory of "Socialism in one country" which denied that the Soviet economy needed foreign help to develop, and open advocates of Western management techniques fell into disfavor. No longer celebrated by Soviet leadership, Taylorism and the mass production methods of Henry Ford remained silent influences during the industrialization of the Soviet Union. Nevertheless, "[...] Frederick Taylor's methods have never really taken root in the Soviet Union." The voluntaristic approach of Stalin's Stakhanovite movement in the 1930s, fixated on setting individual records, was intrinsically opposed to Taylor's systematic approach and proved to be counter-productive. The stop-and-go of the production process – workers having nothing to do at the beginning of a month and 'storming' during illegal extra shifts at the end of the month – which prevailed even in the 1980s had nothing to do with the successfully taylorized plants e.g., of Toyota which are characterized by continuous production processes (heijunka) which are continuously improved (kaizen).

"The easy availability of replacement labor, which allowed Taylor to choose only 'first-class men,' was an important condition for his system's success."  The situation in the Soviet Union was very different.  "Because work is so unrhythmic, the rational manager will hire more workers than he would need if supplies were even in order to have enough for storming. Because of the continuing labor shortage, managers are happy to pay needed workers more than the norm, either by issuing false job orders, assigning them to higher skill grades than they deserve on merit criteria, giving them 'loose' piece rates, or making what is supposed to be 'incentive' pay, premia for good work, effectively part of the normal wage. As Mary McAuley has suggested under these circumstances piece rates are not an incentive wage, but a way of justifying giving workers whatever they 'should' be getting, no matter what their pay is supposed to be according to the official norms."

Taylor and his theories are also referenced (and put to practice) in the 1921 dystopian novel We by Yevgeny Zamyatin.

Canada
In the early 1920s, the Canadian textile industry was re-organized according to scientific management principles. In 1928, workers at Canada Cotton Ltd. in Hamilton, Ontario went on strike against newly introduced Taylorist work methods. Also, Henry Gantt, who was a close associate of Taylor, re-organized the Canadian Pacific Railway.

With the prevalence of US branch plants in Canada and close economic and cultural ties between the two countries, the sharing of business practices, including Taylorism, has been common.

The Taylor Society and its legacy
The Taylor Society was founded in 1912 by Taylor's allies to promote his values and influence. A decade after Taylor's death in 1915 the Taylor Society had 800 members, including many leading U.S. industrialists and managers. In 1936 the Society merged with the Society of Industrial Engineers, forming the Society for Advancement of Management, which still exists today.

Criticism of Taylor
Many of the critiques of Taylor come from Marxists. The earliest was by Antonio Gramsci, an Italian Communist, in his Prison Notebooks (1937). Gramsci argued that Taylorism subordinates the  workers to management. He also argued that the repetitive work produced by Taylorism might actually give rise to revolutionary thoughts in workers' minds.

Harry Braverman's work Labor and Monopoly Capital: The Degradation of Work in the Twentieth Century, published in 1974, was critical of scientific management and of Taylor in particular. This work pioneered the field of Labor Process Theory as well as contributing to the historiography of the workplace.

Management theorist Henry Mintzberg is highly critical of Taylor's methods. Mintzberg states that an obsession with efficiency allows measurable benefits to overshadow less quantifiable social benefits completely, and social values get left behind.

Taylor's methods have also been challenged by socialists. Their arguments relate to progressive defanging of workers in the workplace and the subsequent degradation of work as management, powered by capital, uses Taylor's methods to render work repeatable and precise yet monotonous and skill-reducing. James W. Rinehart argued that Taylor's methods of transferring control over production from workers to management, and the division of labor into simple tasks, intensified the alienation of workers that had begun with the factory system of production around the period 1870 to 1890.

Criticism of Taylor and the Japanese model, according to Kōnosuke Matsushita:

"We are going to win and the industrial west is going to lose out; ... the reasons for failure are within yourselves. Your firms are built on the Taylor model. Even worse, so are your heads. With your bosses doing the thinking while workers wield the screwdrivers, you’re convinced deep down that it is the right way to run a business. For the essence of management is getting ideas out of the heads of the bosses and into the heads of labour. We are beyond your mindset. Business, we know, is now so complex and difficult, the survival of firms so hazardous in an environment increasingly unpredictable, competitive and fraught with danger, that their continued existence depends on the day-to-day mobilisation of every ounce of intelligence."

Tennis and golf accomplishments
Taylor was an accomplished tennis and golf player. He and Clarence Clark won the inaugural United States National tennis doubles championship at Newport Casino in 1881, defeating Alexander Van Rensselaer and Arthur Newbold (né Arthur Emlen Newbold; 1859–1920) in straight sets. In the 1900 Summer Olympics, Taylor finished fourth in golf.

Publications
Books

 
 
 
 

Selected articles

Bibliography

Notes

References

 ; ; ; .

  , ; ; ;  (ABI/Inform Collection).
  ; ; .
  ; ; .
  ; ; .
  ; ; ; .

 (2 Vols.) ; .
 
 

  .
  & .
  .
 
 
"Mr. Taylor has taken out about one hundred patents, his greatest invention being the discovery between 1898 and 1900, jointly with Mr. Maunsel White, of the Taylor-White process of treating tungsten steel. This invention, according to the highest authorities, has revolutionized the machine shops of the world, enabling tools to cut metal at least three times as rapidly as before. The inventors received $100,000 [] for the English patents alone. Fame again came to Mr. Taylor upon his publication, in 1906, of the results of the extended researches of himself and others in the art of cutting metals – a work of genuine scientific character, and of the highest practical importance. Mr. Taylor, however, regarded as of far greater moment than all this other work his share in the discovery of the principles of scientific management."

 
 
  .
 The "M.E." represents Taylor's 1883 Bachelor's degree in Mechanical Engineering from Stevens Institute of Technology; the "Sc.D." was an honorary degree conferred by Penn in 1906.
   .

  .
  .
  ; .The article is also included in a compilation book →  ; .
  ;  (ABI/Inform Collection); ; .
  ; ; .

 ; .

  .
  ; ; .Kipping is a professor at the Schulich School of Business.

   (Business Premier database); ; .Mee wrote the article for SAM's Golden Anniversary issue →  , .
 
  .
 For the stories about Schmidt, Montgomery refers to →  ; ; ; .

  ; ; .

 
  ; .
   (1st ed.), ; ; .
  ;  (2011 ed.); 
  .
   .
   .
  .

  ; ; .
  

 

  ; ; .
  ; ; .
  ; ; . Online here.

 
 
Also accessible via:
 
 Online reprint by the New York Times Leaning Network (online education blog) → 
 
"Frederick Winslow Taylor, originator of the modern scientific management movement "

 

 ; .
 .Shop Management began as an address by Taylor to a meeting of the ASME, which published it in pamphlet form. The linked publication is a 1912 re-print.
  ; .

Further reading

See also
 C. Bertrand Thompson

External links

 
 
  .
  .
  Series III: Frederick W. Taylor

American industrial engineers
American mechanical engineers
American steel industry businesspeople
1856 births
1915 deaths
American business theorists
American management consultants
Bethlehem Steel people
American organizational theorists
Patternmakers (industrial)
Presidents of the American Society of Mechanical Engineers
Fellows of the American Society of Mechanical Engineers
Public administration scholars
Quality experts
Amateur golfers
American male golfers
American male tennis players
American people of English descent
Burials at West Laurel Hill Cemetery
Germantown Academy alumni
Golfers at the 1900 Summer Olympics
Golfers from Philadelphia
Grand Slam (tennis) champions in men's doubles
Deaths from pneumonia in Pennsylvania
Members of the American Philosophical Society
Olympic golfers of the United States
Phillips Exeter Academy alumni
Stevens Institute of Technology alumni
Tennis players from Philadelphia
Time and motion study
Tuck School of Business faculty
United States National champions (tennis)
19th-century male tennis players
19th-century American engineers
20th-century American engineers
19th-century American writers
20th-century American writers
19th-century American businesspeople